This is a list of Romanian football transfers for the summer 2015 transfer windows. Only moves featuring at least one Liga I club are listed.

Transfers

Summer window

References

Romania
2015
Transfers